Caccia (Italian for "hunt") may refer to:

 Caccia al Re – La narcotici, an Italian television series 
 Caccia e Pesca, an Italy-based premium television channel 
 Caccia Birch House in New Zealand
 Xagħra, a village in Malta known as Caccia to English residents
 Oboe da caccia, a musical instrument of the oboe family
 Caccia (:It:Caccia (musica)), a musical genre of the 14th and 15th centuries employing canon (music)  

People
 Camillo Caccia Dominioni (1877 - 1946), Italian Cardinal 
 Charles Caccia (1930–2008), Canadian politician
 Diego Caccia (born 1981), Italian cyclist
 Federico Caccia (1635 – 1699), an Italian diplomat and Roman Catholic prelate
 Gabriele Giordano Caccia (born 1958), an Italian Catholic prelate and diplomat
 Guglielmo Caccia, a painter known as "il Moncalvo"
 Harold Caccia, Baron Caccia (1905 - 1990), a British diplomat
 Joe Caccia (1899 – 1931), American racecar driver
 Nicola Caccia (born 1970) Italian professional football player
 Orsola Caccia, a painter and daughter of Guglielmo

Italian-language surnames